Takezō, Takezo or Takezou (written:  or ) is a masculine Japanese given name. Notable people with the name include:

, Japanese handball player
, Japanese politician, diplomat, judge and baseball commissioner 
, Japanese rakugo artist

Japanese masculine given names